Vladimir Fyodorovich Konstantinov (22 February 1921 – 15 July 1979) was a Soviet bomber and ground attack pilot during World War II. Awarded the title Hero of the Soviet Union in 1944 for his sorties on a Po-2 night bomber, he went on to hold various posts in assault and fighter-bomber aviation regiments, and achieved the rank of colonel in 1969. His sister, Tamara Konstantinova, an Il-2 pilot during the war, was also awarded the title Hero of the Soviet Union.

References 

1921 births
1979 deaths
Heroes of the Soviet Union
Recipients of the Order of the Red Banner
Recipients of the Order of Alexander Nevsky
Recipients of the Order of the Red Star